Judah and 46th Avenue station is a light rail stop on the Muni Metro N Judah line, located in the Sunset District neighborhood of San Francisco, California. The station opened with the N Judah line on October 21, 1928. The station has two short side platforms in the middle of Judah Street (traffic islands) where passengers board or depart from trains. The station is not accessible to people with disabilities.

In March 2014, Muni released details of the proposed implementation of their Transit Effectiveness Project (later rebranded MuniForward), which included a variety of stop changes for the N Judah line. Under that plan – which will be implemented as the N Judah Rapid Project – the stop will have its short traffic islands extended to accommodate longer trains.

References

External links 

SFMTA – Judah and 46th Avenue inbound and outbound
SFBay Transit (unofficial) – Judah St & 46th Ave

Muni Metro stations
Sunset District, San Francisco